Marriage Strike may refer to:

Marriage Strike (1930 film), German silent comedy
Marriage Strike (1935 film), German comedy
Marriage Strike (1953 film), German comedy remake of 1935 film